Albina Airstrip  is an airport serving Albina, the capital of the Marowijne District of Suriname. It is one of the oldest airports in Suriname, in use since 1953, when the Piper Cub (PZ-NAC) of Kappel-van Eyck named "Colibri" landed there from Zorg en Hoop Airport.

Airlines and destinations 
Airlines serving this airport are:

See also

 List of airports in Suriname
 Transport in Suriname

References

External links
 
Albina Airport
OurAirports - Albina
OpenStreetMap - Albina

Airports in Suriname
Marowijne District